Habrosyne intermedia is a moth in the family Drepanidae. It is found in the Russian Far East, the Korean Peninsula, Japan, India, Nepal and China.

The larvae feed on Rubus species.

Subspecies
Habrosyne intermedia intermedia (south-eastern Russia, Japan, Korean Peninsula, China: Heilongjiang)
Habrosyne intermedia conscripta Warren, 1912 (India, Nepal, China: Hebei, Shaanxi, Ningxia, Gansu, Qinghai, Sichuan, Yunnan, Tibet)

References

Moths described in 1864
Thyatirinae